Rangers AFC was one of the oldest football teams in New Zealand and was located in Christchurch, New Zealand. In 2007 they merged with New Brighton to form Coastal Spirit

History 

Rangers AFC was founded in 1910 by a group of dedicated players who were denied the opportunity to play on Saturday owing to the nature of their employment. All were employed in the retail trade, which in 1910 opened all day Saturday for business and closed on a Thursday afternoon and games were arranged against teams which could play them that particular day.

The club was officially constituted under the Canterbury Football Association in 1913 when the half-day closing on Saturday was adopted for all retail merchants.

The years 1916 to 1923 were very strong ones for the club. They won their first championship in 1916, the English Cup in 1917 and 1918, the English Cup again in 1921. The Hurley Shield in 1922, the English Cup in 1923.

The first year of the Southern League in 1968 saw the appointment of Terry Haydon as the club's first professional coach, and he soon produced a team that was rated second in the top ten in NZ and narrowly lost the first Southern League competition on goal average. During this period of the late 60's Rangers played a part in the formation of Christchurch United AFC for the proposed forthcoming National League to start in 1970. Rangers provided a quarter of the A class shares in Christchurch United and also several prominent players, including Terry Haydon and Victor Pollard, who were both selected for New Zealand teams while playing for Rangers. Rangers still hold twenty five percent of the A class shares but do not exercise their right to have a director on United's board.

Determined to make National League status on their own, and in their own way, Rangers concentrated again on overcoming the loss of their best players to United and after a slow start, the 70's were the most successful period in the club's history up to that time, culminating in a place in the National League for 1980. The team won the Southern League in 1973, the Northern Division in 1974, the full Southern League again in 1975, runners up in 1976, third in 1977, runners up in 1978 and won it in 1979. In the years 1973 and 1975 they took part in the play-offs for a place in the National League but were unsuccessful.

Rangers eventually won automatic promotion to National League for the 1980 season and finished ninth in the League. At the end of 1981 Rangers were relegated. In 1984 they were second in the Southern League and challenged unsuccessfully for a National League place in the play-off series. As winners of the Southern League in 1985 they again challenged unsuccessfully for a place in the National League. With the introduction of the Winfield Superclub competition in 1993 came an influx of ex Christchurch United players. They finished runners-up in the Southern section and qualified for the national top eight competition and also the Chatham Cup Final, going down 6–0 to Napier City Rovers.

In 2007 they merged with New Brighton to form Coastal Spirit.

Colours and badge 
Rangers AFC's colours were white shirts, black shorts and black socks. The colours were based on Derby County Colours, and were finalised in the early 1970s by the club secretary Bert Koppes. The change colours were all sky blue.
The club's 'stylised lion' crest was designed in 1972 by Yaap Koster. It is based on the lion found on the crest of the famous Scottish club, Rangers FC, and chosen because of the similarity in club names.

Stadium 
Rangers AFC use to play their home matches on Eric Adam Park (formerly known as Rangers Park) in Christchurch. There secondary ground was Cuthberts Green.

Noted players 
Listed according to when they debuted for Rangers AFC first team (year in parentheses), women in quotes:
1910s–1920s: Alex Bisset (1919), Len Barwell
1950s: Ron Moore (1958)
1960s: Terry Haydon (1968), Victor Pollard (1968), Ken Olley (1962), Dick Durant (1962), Derek Torkington (1968), Alex Inglis (1960), Malcolm Parker (1969)
1970s: Derek Phillips (1970), Richard Hadlee (1971), Neil Francis (1971), Gordon Faichnie (1972), Geoff Taylor (1974), Steve Welford ( 1975)
Owen Nuttridge (1976), John Souter (1976), Mike Fulham (1977), Paul Welford (1977), Luke Campfens (1977), Scott Dewar (1977), Jeff Blackburn (1978), Grant Hughes (1978),  "Ingrid Hall", "Tina Faichnie"
1980s: Ian Cowan (1980), Bobby Almond (1983), "Rowena Fulham", "Michelle Hudson", "Kelly Jarden"
 1990s: John Campbell (1990), Nathan Astle (1990), Mike Harvey (1991), Alan Carville (1993), Mike Fullen (1993), Garry Lund (1993), Alan Stroud (1993), Laurence Fitzpatrick (1993), Neil Hinton (1994), Deane Hutchinson (1995), Jason Stapley (1995), Nic Longley (1995), Paul Hughes (1997), Richard Wilson (1999)
2000s: Chris Peck (2000), "Sara Clapham", Jacabo Egues (2002), Nathan Knox (2003),  "Ingrid Bain" (2004), Vitalijs Teplovs (2006)

Noted coaches 
Listed according to when they became coaches for Rangers AFC (year in parentheses):
1970s: Bob Carter (1972), Ian Marshall (1973), Ken France (1977)
1990s: Fred Simpson (1999)

Achievements 
 Mainland Premier League:
 Runners-up (1): 2001
 Chatham Cup:
 Runners-up (1): 1993
 English Cup:
 Winners (7): 1917, 1918, 1921, 1923, 1979, 1994, 1995
 Runners-up (4): 1964, 1989, 1992, 1993
 Rangers Pre-Season Tournament:
 Winners (5): 1976, 1987, 1992, 1993, 2002
 Runners-up (9): 1973, 1975, 1978, 1979, 1982, 1985, 1986, 1995, 2003, 2006
 Canterbury Premier League:
 Runners-up (1): 1998
 Superclub South:
 Runners-up (1): 1993
 Superclub South Plate:
 Winners (1): 1994
 Southern League:
Winners (6): 1973, 1975, 1979, 1983, 1984, 1985
 Runners-up (5): 1968, 1976, 1978, 1982, 1987
 Southern League (North):
 Winners (4): 1974, 1982, 1983, 1985
 Runners-up (1): 1984
 Hurley Shield (Canterbury Championship):
 Winners (3): 1916, 1922, 1931 (shared)
 Division 1 Cup:
 Winners (2): 1963, 1964
 Runners-up (2): 1968, 1969
 Canterbury Division 2:
  Winners (2): 1927, 1957
 Runners-up (1): 1963
 Division 2 Cup:
 Winners (1): 1927
 Runners-up (1): 1957
 Hurley Shield (Canterbury Pre-Season):
 Winners (1): 1991
 Runners-up (2): 1988, 1993
 Junior National Cup:
 Winners (2): 1976, 1977
 Canterbury Womens League:
 Winners (6): 1976, 1977, 1978, 1979, 1981, 1982

Records 
 League victory: 9–1 v Shamrock AFC, 20 July 1968; 9–0 (Div 2) v Christchurch City AFC Reserves, 13 July 1957; 10–2 (Div 2) v Wigram, 11 May 1963, 9–1 (Div 2) v Hornby, 10 June 1963
 National League placing: 9th, 1980; 8th place in National round of Superclub 1993
 Men's First Team Appearances as at end of 2006: 357, Mike Harvey (1991–2006)
 Men's First Team Goals as at end of 2006: 159, Malcolm Parker (1969–1986), 303 games

References 
 Clayton, P. (22 May 2003).  “Rangers AFC”, FootballCrests.com. Retrieved 24 January 2006.
 Hawkey, J. (2005). "Rangers AFC Yearbook and Statistics 2005". Christchurch, New Zealand: Rangers AFC.
 Millmow, J. (28 July 1997). Rangers hold leader to draw. “The Press”, Christchurch, New Zealand, p. 32.

External links 
 Rangers AFC – clubs old site
 Rangers AFC on Mainland Soccer site – page on official Federation site
 NZ Clubs Database
 New Zealand 2004/05 Season Results

Association football clubs established in 1913
Association football clubs in Christchurch
1913 establishments in New Zealand